Butler Capital Partners is a French private equity firm headquartered in Paris. The firm focuses primarily on investments in France and Europe, and operates in a variety of business sectors including distribution, logistics, advertising, information technology, publishing and market research.

History 
The firm was founded in 1991 by businessman Walter Butler, and is based in Paris, France.

Some of the firm's notable investments include Virgin Megastores, Paris Saint-Germain F.C. and SNCM.

See also
 Eurazeo
 Newfund
 Fondinvest Capital
 PAI Partners

References

External links 
 

Private equity firms of France